Duplessis is a provincial electoral district in the Côte-Nord region of Quebec, Canada, that elects members to the National Assembly of Quebec.  It notably includes the municipalities of Sept-Îles, Port-Cartier, Havre-Saint-Pierre, Fermont and the community of Maliotenam.  It also includes a single municipality from the Nord-du-Québec region: the Naskapi village municipality of Kawawachikamach (not to be confused with the Naskapi reserved land of the same name, which Duplessis also includes, but is in Côte-Nord).

It was created for the 1960 election from parts of the Saguenay provincial electoral district.

In the change from the 2001 to the 2011 electoral map, it gained the unorganized territories of Caniapiscau and Lac-Juillet from Ungava electoral district.

The riding was named after former Quebec Premier Maurice Duplessis who led the province from 1936 to 1939 and from 1944 to 1959 as leader of the Union Nationale.

Members of the Legislative Assembly / National Assembly

Geography

The riding is located on the lower north shore of the Saint Lawrence River.

Linguistic demographics
Francophone: 79.8%
Anglophone: 9.1%
Allophone: 11.1%  (10.5% Montagnais-Naskapi)

Election results

|-

|-
  
|Liberal
|Pierre Cormier
|align="right"|6,300
|align="right"|34.28
|-

|-

|-

|-
  
|Liberal
|Marc Proulx
|align="right"|6,288
|align="right"|27.62
|align="right"|

|-

|-

|-
  
|Liberal
|Marc Proulx
|align="right"|8,018
|align="right"|35.15
|align="right"|

|-

|Independent
|André Forbes
|align="right"|1,334
|align="right"|5.85
|align="right"|–
|-
|}

|-

|-
  
|Liberal
|Richard Scanlan
|align="right"|8,395
|align="right"|32.32
|align="right"|

|}

References

External links
Information
 Elections Quebec

Election results
 Election results (National Assembly)

Maps
 2011 map (PDF)
 2001 map (Flash)
2001–2011 changes (Flash)
1992–2001 changes (Flash)
 Electoral map of Côte-Nord region
 Quebec electoral map, 2011

Quebec provincial electoral districts
Sept-Îles, Quebec